The Shangliu Temple is a Buddhist temple located in Qingshanqiao Town of Ningxiang City, Hunan Province, People's Republic of China. It includes the Shanmen, Mahavira Hall, Meditation Hall, Dining Room, Guanyin Pavilion, etc.

History
Shangliu Temple was built in Qing dynasty (1644–1911).

During the New Culture Movement (1910 and 1920s), it was occupied. The last abbot Keyi fled to the Fozu Mountain and went into seclusion. It was used as a sewing school. Later, it was used as the schoolhouse of Ningxiang Primary School.

In 1939, it was used as the Government Office of Shangliu Township.

References

Buddhist temples in Changsha
Buildings and structures in Ningxiang